Eggink is a surname. Notable people with the surname include:

Gertie Eggink (born 1980), Dutch sidecarcross rider
Herman Eggink (born 1949), Dutch rower
Stephanie Eggink (born 1988), American mixed martial artist

See also
Eggins